Communauté d'agglomération Gap-Tallard-Durance is the communauté d'agglomération, an intercommunal structure, centred on the city of Gap. It is located in the Hautes-Alpes and Alpes-de-Haute-Provence departments, in the Provence-Alpes-Côte d'Azur region, southeastern France. Created in 2017, its seat is in Gap. Its area is 351.4 km2. Its population was 50,483 in 2019, of which 40,631 in Gap proper.

Composition
The communauté d'agglomération consists of the following 17 communes, of which two (Claret and Curbans) in the Alpes-de-Haute-Provence department:

Barcillonnette
Châteauvieux
Claret
Curbans
Esparron
Fouillouse
La Freissinouse
Gap
Jarjayes
Lardier-et-Valença
Lettret
Neffes
Pelleautier
La Saulce
Sigoyer
Tallard
Vitrolles

References

Gap-Tallard-Durance
Gap-Tallard-Durance
Gap-Tallard-Durance